Jamalpur Mirzapur is a village in Mau district, in Indian state of Uttar Pradesh, India.
It is situated in a remote area of Uttar Pradesh and approximately 330 km from the state capital Lucknow. Jamalpur Mirzapur is locally known for its political, social and economic importance. It is a block village of almost 120 villages. There are government hospitals and government primary schools. There is also one school for special training for girls and disabled children for free.
the developing villages in the block Ghosi itself. Its nearby town block is the famous block "Ghosi" situated on NH-7 & Varanasi-gorakahpur Highway NH29 and basically famous for bricks. Manufacturing area covering some villages of Jamalpur MIRZAPUR as well as forty percent villages of GHOSI.

Geography 
Nearest city to Jamalpur is Varanasi where good students go for further studies as educational infrastructure in Jamalpur is good.
Near to Jamalpur, Aharura is a tourist place where is a major movie shooting site. It is connected to Jamalpur through the roads NH-7 and NH-2.

Demographics 
Jamalpur is a place where religious adherence is across most inhabitants. The total population of Jamalpur (as per 2001 census) is 4229. In this village biyars is dominant caste  sub caste of Other Backward Class category.

Politics

Regional politics 
Jamalpur has always politically important in Mirzapur district of Uttar Pradesh due to its large numbers of vote bank and many times deciding place for winning of MLA seat for Omprakash singh, a renowned Bharatiya Janata Party candidate and many times MLA of this area.

Village politics 
Jamalpur is a village where healthy politics has almost never been practiced.  Gram panchayat system is practiced here in which biyars of the same village has ruled for most of the time. Pirdkhir And Bhadawal gram in most famous villages in this block. This village most population in government job and present time gram pradhan Mr. Sanjay Singh(JDU).

Education 
At the name of education there are many school and colleges but Guru Karshni Mahavidyalaya, Kasihar, Surha, Adalhat, Chunar, Mirzapur is very famous college in the field of Higher Education i.e. B.ED, BA, MA courses, Hotel and hospitality management's, primary and junior high schools along with government added Sri mati Deocali Inter College.

Entertainment 
Though Jamalpur is not a place developed like a city yet there are many means of entertainment here like gambling, Cricket (just played by local guys and some tournaments are organized in the main ground of Sri mati Deocali Inter College), and some athletic games like Kabaddi (especially at the eve of Naag panchami).

Villages in Mirzapur district